Pseudoceros goslineri, the Gosliner flatworm, is a marine flatworm species that belongs to the family Pseudocerotidae.

Distribution 
It is found in the tropical Indo-Pacific, from the eastern coast of Africa to the Micronesia, including the Red Sea.

Habitat 
External slope or top on coral reef.

Size 

Physical characteristics 
"External anatomy: Flatworm with irregular and variable color pattern characterized mainly by a cream background mottled with orange, and pink and purple-red dots concentrated medially forming an elongated blotch. The margin consists of purple and pink irregular spots and dots that are more concentrated on the tentacles making the tips a little darker. The ventral side is light violet. Pseudotentacles formed by simple folds of the anterior margin with few marginal eyes. Cerebral cluster made of about 30 eyespots. Presence of a broad folded pharynx.
Internal anatomy: The male reproductive system consists of unbranched vas deferens, an elongated seminal vesicle connected to a short and coiled ejaculatory duct, a round prostatic vesicle, and a small stylet housed in a deep antrum. The female system has a deep and tubular female antrum with curved cement pouches and a short vagina directed backwards and surrounded by the cement gland."

Behaviour 
Benthic, diurnals, because of its aposematic colors, it has no fear to crawl around to feed.

Feeding 
Pseudoceros goslineri feeds on various colonial ascidians.

References 
 Leslie Newman & Lester Cannon, "Marine Flatworms",CSIRO publishing,2003,
 Neville Coleman, "Marine life of Maldives",Atoll editions,2004,
 Andrea & Antonnella Ferrrari,"Macrolife",Nautilus publishing,2003,

External links 
 Pseudoceros goslineri 
 Discover Life, Pseudoceros goslineri 
 Vie Océane, Pseudoceros goslineri

Turbellaria
Animals described in 1994